Godet may refer to:

 a brand name of cognac
 Godet (sewing), a sewing technique that adds width and volume to a garment
 Godet Island, now Hinson's Island, an island of Bermuda
 Frédéric Louis Godet  (1812–1900), Swiss Protestant theologian
 Paul Godet des Marais (1647–1709), French Bishop of Chartres

See also
 Gaudet
 Les Godets, an education building designed by French architect Jean Nouvel in Antony, France
 Godot (disambiguation)